Bo Ragnar Ericson (born January 23, 1958, in Stockholm, Sweden) is an ice hockey player who played for the Swedish national team. He won a bronze medal at the 1984 Winter Olympics.

Career statistics

Regular season and playoffs

International

References 

2. Bo Ericson's profile at ElitePropects.com

1958 births
AIK IF players
Colorado Rockies (NHL) draft picks
Ice hockey players at the 1984 Winter Olympics
Living people
Medalists at the 1984 Winter Olympics
Olympic bronze medalists for Sweden
Olympic ice hockey players of Sweden
Olympic medalists in ice hockey
Ice hockey people from Stockholm
Södertälje SK players